Emery High School is a public high school in Emeryville, California, United States for 9th through 12th grades. It is part of the Emery Unified School District. The school has an enrollment of around 200 students.

History 

Emery Secondary School was formerly Emeryville High School; after the closure of Emery Middle School, it became a secondary school with the addition of the 7th and 8th grades.The school building was scheduled to close in 2012 and be replaced by a new facility, housing transitional kindergarten - 8th grades, and 9th - 12th grade sites.

Athletics
The school competes in the Bay Counties League - East.

At the 2003 National Chess Education Association tournament in Anaheim, the Emery Chess Club secured first place in the 8th, 11th and 12th grade categories.

Notable alumni
 Darnell Robinson, retired professional basketball player; while at Emery High, he was the leading scorer in California men's high school basketball history.

Notable faculty
 Edyth May Sliffe, 1901–1986, namesake of an annual award by the Mathematical Association of America.

References

External links
 
 Emery Unified School District

Schools in Alameda County, California
Emeryville, California
Public preparatory schools in California